The American Animal Hospital Association (AAHA) is a non-profit organization for companion animal veterinary hospitals. Established in 1933, the association is the only accrediting body for small animal hospitals in the U.S. and Canada. The association develops standards for veterinary business practices, publications, and educational programs. Any veterinary hospital can join AAHA as a member, but must then pass an evaluation in order to receive AAHA accreditation.

AAHA Accreditation
Unlike human hospitals, veterinary hospitals are not required to be accredited. Accredited hospitals are the only hospitals in the U.S. and Canada that choose to be evaluated on approximately 900 quality standards that go above and beyond basic state regulations, ranging from patient care and pain management to staff training and advanced diagnostic services.

To become AAHA-accredited, practices undergo a rigorous evaluation process to ensure they meet the AAHA Standards of Accreditation, which include the areas of: Patient care, diagnostic imaging, laboratory, pain management, pharmacy, safety, surgery, client service, anesthesia, contagious disease, continuing education, dentistry, examination facilities, medical records, leadership and emergency/urgent care. To maintain accredited status, hospitals undergo comprehensive on-site evaluations every three years, which ensures that hospitals are compliant with the Association's mandatory standards.

Because the accreditation process is so thorough and rigorous, some states are beginning to accept AAHA accreditation in lieu of state inspections. In 2013, Alabama was the first state in the United States to accept AAHA accreditation in place of a state inspection by the State Board of Veterinary Medical Examiners.

Programs and services

AAHA produces guidelines developed by teams of veterinary experts that provide recommendations to improve the quality of pet health care in a veterinary practice. Guidelines are reviewed periodically to ensure that they are accurate and up-to-date with leading data and trends in the veterinary profession.

The AAHA Board of Directors have adopted position statements on many pet health and animal welfare issues. Position statements are reviewed periodically to ensure that they are current and up-to-date with the latest research.

AAHA is recognized as a leading provider of staff training and continuing education for the veterinary industry. AAHA has educational programs for virtually every veterinary team member, including veterinarians, practice owners, practice managers, veterinary technicians, veterinary assistants and front-office staff members. The AAHA conference was the first veterinary conference to host live-streaming surgeries for veterinary professionals.

The AAHA Yearly Conference is the only conference that focuses exclusively on companion animal care. It has been one of the most respected forums for the sharing of both scientific and management knowledge in the veterinary profession since 1934.

AAHA also provides pet health information for pet owners.

Publications
AAHA produces a variety of resources for veterinary professionals and pet owners, including the following.
 Journal of the American Animal Hospital Association (JAAHA) is AAHA's peer-reviewed, bimonthly, scientific journal.
 AAHA Press publishes titles for veterinary care providers and pet owners.
 Trends is a monthly practice-management magazine.
 NEWStat is a subscription service that covers industry trends and breaking news, innovative new research and technology, and legislative updates.

Universal Pet Microchip Lookup Tool

When an animal with a microchip is found, the AAHA's online tool will help veterinarians, animal shelters, animal control and others to locate which chip registries have that particular chip number on file. In the USA there is no centralized chip registry, however this tool checks each of the databases of participating pet chip registries and displays each registry which has that chip number on record.

Partners for Healthy Pets

Partners for Healthy Pets (PHP) was founded by AAHA and the American Veterinary Medical Association (AVMA) to address the declining health of pets and to increase the perceived value of preventive veterinary care.

Pet Nutrition Alliance

The Pet Nutrition Alliance was created by several veterinary organizations including AAHA and AVMA to help raise awareness about the importance of proper pet nutrition, and the value of nutritional assessments for pet at every veterinary visit. Their website offers a collection of tools on pet nutrition for veterinary professionals to use in their practice and to educate clients.

References

External links
 
 Pet Microchip Lookup Tool

Social Media 

Veterinary medicine-related professional associations
Health industry trade groups based in the United States
Non-profit organizations based in Colorado
Organizations established in 1933
Veterinary medicine in the United States